Stac Levenish or Stac Leibhinis (sometimes simply called Levenish/Leibhinis) is a sea stack in the St Kilda archipelago in Scotland.

Its north cliff appears to have the profile of a human face, visible when travelling to St Kilda from the east. The skerry of Na Bodhan lies to the north east.

The stack was climbed recreationally in the early 1900s; Norman Heathcote mentions a moderately difficult ascent in 1900, as part of a climbing expedition that also included an ascent of Stac Lee.

See also
 List of outlying islands of Scotland
 Pareidolia

References

External links
 Pictures
 Painting of the Stac

St Kilda, Scotland
Stacks of Scotland
Landforms of the Outer Hebrides